Season 1976–77 was the 93rd football season in which Dumbarton competed at a Scottish national level, entering the Scottish Football League for the 71st time, the Scottish Cup for the 82nd time and the Scottish League Cup for the 30th time.

Overview 
Dumbarton played for the second successive season in Division 1, but with the Spring Cup being dispensed with, the league programme was extended by each team playing the other 3 times. Facing the unlucky ballot of two away trips to newly relegated Dundee, as well what proved to be the division's top two teams, St Mirren and Clydebank, provided an immediate disadvantage.

Once again a poor start was to scupper Dumbarton's promotion ambitions. On this occasion the transfer of future £1m player Ian Wallace to Coventry City immediately following a 3–3 home draw with Celtic in the season-opening League Cup sections proved a disruptive loss as only a single win was gained from the first 6 league games. Although this was immediately followed by a seven-game unbeaten run, and there was another unbeaten run of five games from the end of November until the end of January, thereafter results were without any level of consistency - something which almost led to manager Alex Wright resigning in February - although a mid-table 7th place was achieved in the end.

In the Scottish Cup it was once again Hearts who were to end any thoughts of a cup run for Dumbarton, losing in a third round replay by the only goal, after a 1-1 drawn game at Tynecastle Park.

In the League Cup, another tough qualifying group, which included two of the top-four Premier Division clubs, Celtic (again) and Dundee United, was to prove to be too much of a hurdle to progress to the knock-out stages. However, 2 wins and 2 draws from the 6 ties (including the 3–3 home draw with Celtic after leading 3–1 at half-time, and a 1–1 draw away to Dundee United) was a creditable achievement for a second-tier side.

Locally, in the Stirlingshire Cup, Dumbarton were defeated by Alloa Athletic in the first round.

Elsewhere during the pre-season a short tour of Spain was undertaken.

Results & fixtures

Scottish First Division

Scottish Cup

Scottish League Cup

Stirlingshire Cup

Pre-season Matches

League table

Player statistics

Squad 

|}

International Caps
Graeme Sinclair was selected to play for Scotland Under23s in a match against England Under23s on April 27, 1977.  The tie - which was part of the unofficial under23 British Home International Championship - was won by England 1–0.  This was the first Dumbarton internationalist, of any sort, for over 15 years.

Transfers

Players in

Players out

Reserve team
Dumbarton competed in the Scottish Reserve League and finished 9th of 18 with 14 wins and 6 draws from 34 matches.

In the Scottish Second XI Cup, Dumbarton lost to Queen of the South in the second round, on penalties, after a 2–2 draw.

In the Scottish Reserve League Cup, Dumbarton failed to qualifying from their section.

Trivia
  Johnny Graham set two records during the season. His appearance in the League match against Montrose on 13 November was his 365th competitive match for the club - overtaking Andy Jardine's record set a decade earlier - and in what was to be his final match for Dumbarton, his appearance in the League match against East Fife on 30 April was his 385th competitive match for the club - setting a new club record - which still stands.
 The fee of £80,000 for Ian Wallace's transfer to Coventry City at the end of August set a new record.
 Despite only a 7th place in the league, John Bourke finished as the First Division's top scorer.
 At the end of the season Alex Wright gave up his managerial duties to accept a directorship and was replaced by his assistant manager Davie Wilson.

See also
 1976–77 in Scottish football

References

External links
Willie Russell (Dumbarton Football Club Historical Archive)
Martin Mowatt (Dumbarton Football Club Historical Archive)
Bobby McCallum (Dumbarton Football Club Historical Archive)
Tommy Mulraine (Dumbarton Football Club Historical Archive)
Scottish Football Historical Archive

Dumbarton F.C. seasons
Scottish football clubs 1976–77 season